Sky Lagoon is a geothermal spa in southwestern Iceland.

Description 
Sky Lagoon is primarily heated by geothermal energy, which keeps the water temperature at approximately 38 to 40 °C (100 to 104 °F). Snæfellsjökull (a glacier-capped volcano) and Keilir mountain are visible from Sky Lagoon.

The spa is a competitor of the nearby Blue Lagoon.

History 
Construction of Sky Lagoon began in early 2020 and was completed in 2021. The design was inspired by the Icelandic geography and uses grey-blues, deep greens, whites and creams to copy the landscape.

Some elements of Sky Lagoon were inspired by Icelandic nature and heritage, such as the turfhouse, turf walls and plunge pool. Elements of the facility include a cave tunnel entrance to a hot springs soaking pool and a cold plunge.

References

External links 

 Sky Lagoon official website

Hot springs of Iceland
Spas
Tourist attractions in Iceland
Kópavogur